Valerio Barigelli (born 19 October 1982) is an Italian futsal player who plays for Lazio and the Italian national futsal team.

References

External links
UEFA profile

1982 births
Living people
Futsal goalkeepers
Sportspeople from Rome
Italian men's futsal players